Macrobathra arneutis is a moth in the family Cosmopterigidae. It is found in India (Assam).

References

Natural History Museum Lepidoptera generic names catalog

Macrobathra
Moths described in 1914